Jaroslav Štork (3 April 1909 – 12 November 1980) was a Czech racewalker. He competed in the men's 50 kilometres walk at the 1936 Summer Olympics.

References

External links
 

1909 births
1980 deaths
People from Pardubice District
People from the Kingdom of Bohemia
Czech male racewalkers
Olympic athletes of Czechoslovakia
Athletes (track and field) at the 1936 Summer Olympics
Sportspeople from the Pardubice Region